Rusty n Edie's BBS (Rusty-N-Edie's) was a bulletin board system founded on May 11, 1987 by the two SysOps, Russell & Edwina Hardenburgh, of Boardman, Ohio.  At one point the BBS had over 14,000 subscribers across the United States, Canada, and Europe (each paying an $89 annual membership fee) and over 124 modem lines.

On January 30, 1993, the system was raided by the FBI for software piracy after a several month investigation in cooperation with the Software Publishers Association (SPA). On March 11, 1993, a copyright infringement lawsuit was filed by Playboy Enterprises in response to 412 adult GIF images available for download, which had come from the pages of Playboy magazine, and had been scanned in. The case was dismissed on February 3, 1998 after a settlement was reached.

Quotations

References

Bulletin board systems
Copyright enforcement